Valdas is a Lithuanian masculine given name. It is the shortened form of Valdemaras and other Lithuanian names containing the Germanic or Baltic element "wald" ("rule"). Individuals with the name Valdas include:

Valdas Adamkus (born 1926), Lithuanian politician, former President of Lithuania
Valdas Dabkus (born  1984), Lithuanian basketball player 
Valdas Dambrauskas (born 1977), Lithuanian football manager
Valdas Dopolskas (born 1992) Lithuanian marathon runner
Valdas Ivanauskas (born 1966), Lithuanian footballer 
Valdas Kasparavičius (born 1958), Lithuanian footballer 
Valdas Kazlauskas (born 1958), Lithuanian racewalker 
Valdas Trakys (born 1979), Lithuanian footballer
Valdas Urbonas (born 1967), Lithuanian footballer
Valdas Vasylius (born 1983), Lithuanian basketball player

Lithuanian masculine given names